Jiulong, the atonal pinyin romanization of various Chinese words and names, may refer to:

Places
Jiulong County (九龙县) of Garzê Tibetan Autonomous Prefecture, Sichuan
Jiulong River (九龙江) in Fujian

Towns
Jiulong, Fuyang, in Yingzhou District, Fuyang, Anhui
Jiulong, Chongqing, in Jiulongpo District, Chongqing
Jiulong, Guangzhou, in Luogang District, Guangzhou, Guangdong
Jiulong, Yingde, in Yingde City, Guangdong
Jiulong, Laishui County, in Laishui County, Hebei
Jiulong, Zhongmu County, in Zhongmu County, Henan
Jiulong, Taizhou, Jiangsu, in Hailing District, Taizhou, Jiangsu
Jiulong, Yugan County, in Yugan County, Jiangxi
Jiulong, Jiaozhou, in Jiaozhou City, Shandong
Jiulong, Jintang County, in Jintang County, Sichuan
Jiulong, Linshui County, in Linshui County, Sichuan
Jiulong, Mianzhu, in Mianzhu City, Sichuan
Jiulong, Yuechi County, in Yuechi County, Sichuan
Jiulong, Luoping County, in Luoping County, Yunnan

Townships
Jiulong, Dengzhou, in Dengzhou City, Henan
Jiulong, Anyue County, in Anyue County, Sichuan
Jiulong, Leshan, in Shizhong District, Leshan, Sichuan
Jiulong, Wangcang County, in Wangcang County, Sichuan
Jiulong, Yilong County, in Yilong County, Sichuan
Jiulong, Luquan County, in Luquan Yi and Miao Autonomous County, Sichuan
Jiulong, Jingning She Autonomous County, in Jingning She Autonomous County, Zhejiang

Waterfalls
Jiulong Waterfall (Anhui) in Huangshan, Anhui
Jiulong Waterfall (Yunnan) in Luoping County, Yunnan

Other uses
Nine Dragons Paper Holdings Limited (玖龙纸业控股), a paper manufacturer in mainland China

See also
 Kowloon (disambiguation) for Cantonese places known as Jiulong in Mandarin Chinese
 九龍 (disambiguation) ('nine dragons')